Serong is a surname. Notable people with the name include:

 Bill Serong (born 1936), Australian rules footballer
 Caleb Serong (born 2001), Australian rules footballer
 Ted Serong (1915–2002), Australian Army officer

See also
 Sarong, Indonesian garment